Cassandra Beth "Casey" LeBlanc (born November 4, 1987) is a Canadian recording artist, She was a contestant on the third season of the popular reality television show Canadian Idol, and was the fifth-place finisher. Born in Woodstock, New Brunswick, the eldest daughter of Constance and Leo LeBlanc, she is from Nackawic, New Brunswick. Her two younger siblings include Evan and Delaney LeBlanc.

Canadian Idol 
In the Top 32 round, she sang Sam Cooke's "Bring it on Home to Me" which earned her a place in the Top 10.

Performances
Songs that Casey performed include:
 Top 32: "Bring It On Home to Me" (Sam Cooke)
 Top 10: "From This Moment" (Shania Twain) (Canadian Hits week)
 Top 9: "Heaven Help Us All" (Stevie Wonder week)
 Top 8: "Like A Prayer" (Madonna) (Eighties week)
 Top 7: "I Could Write a Book" (Big Band week)
 Top 6: "I'll Stand By You" (The Pretenders) (Classic Rock week)
 Top 5: "Timeless Love" (The Guess Who week)

Recap
On the August 10, 2005, results show, Casey was in the bottom three for the first time in the competition.  The next week, however, Casey was back in the top three following a performance on "I'll Stand By You" which was lauded by the four judges.  However, on the August 24 show, despite contentions by the judges that she had her best performance so far on the show, she received the fewest votes and was sent home.

During her stay on the show, she was the center of some discussion over voting patterns, with some claiming that she benefited from regional voting, which is assumed to work to the advantage of candidates from Atlantic Canada.  On the other hand, her supporters pointed to one episode of the show where there had been a glitch in the Aliant telephone system which kept much of New Brunswick from voting that night, yet she still placed in the top half.  (New Brunswick accounts for less than 3% of the Canadian population.)

Arguments over regional voting have been a staple of discussion since the inception of Canadian Idol and have continued into the 2006 season, with some believing that Brandon Jones from New Brunswick and Craig Sharpe from Newfoundland have benefited from regional voting.  Candidates who have been assumed to benefit from regional voting have also been high on the list of those targeted by the web site, Vote for the Worst.

Casey LeBlanc made it to the top 5 in the competition.  On September 25, 2005, the Town of Nackawic celebrated her success by naming a street after her.  A section of Route 105 running near the town is now known as Casey Way.  On that day, Casey was honored at a celebration in the park. She arrived at the festival by helicopter and sang three songs, including her signature theme, Bring It On Home. In October 2006, persons unknown made off with one of the signs marking Casey Way. Two replacements were also stolen. Replacement costs were around $500 per sign.

Post Idol
In October 2005, Casey became a spokesperson for the New Brunswick Laubach Literacy Foundation, a group with promotes adult literacy acquisition. She also appeared at several other community and charity events throughout the province during the fall of 2005.

On November 23, 2005, Casey appeared before a crowd of 1,653 fans in her first major concert.  The University of New Brunswick's Aitken Centre was the venue for this concert in which Casey was backed up by the Halifax band, Shaydid.  She sang many of the songs she had performed on Canadian Idol, including Stevie Wonder's Heaven Help Us All, The Guess Who's Timeless Love, The Pretenders' I'll Stand By You, and Sam Cooke's Bring It On Home.

LeBlanc has formed a group called Braided with fellow former season 3 contestants Ashley Leitao and Amber Fleury. Their first album was released on Tuesday, August 1, 2006. Their first single entitled "A Little Bit Closer" was released to radio on June 15, 2006.

LeBlanc opened for Alan Jackson at the Country Rocks the Hill concert at Magnetic Hill, Moncton on August 19, 2006.

In late 2006, Casey went to Afghanistan with a number of other musicians, entertaining troops stationed there. On November 28, she performed at Kandahar Airfield in a three-hour concert.

She recorded a song called "Weather the Storm" with New Brunswick artist Dwane Drost, with proceeds to support cancer survivors.

She was married in Nackawic on August 22, 2009.

References

External links
 Casey LeBlanc's Canadian Idol page

1987 births
Acadian people
Canadian Idol participants
Living people
Musicians from Woodstock, New Brunswick
People from York County, New Brunswick